This is a list of academic journals in the field of disability studies.

 Disability & Society
 Disability Studies Quarterly
 Disability and Rehabilitation
 Disability and Rehabilitation: Assistive Technology
 Focus on Autism and Other Developmental Disabilities
 Journal of Disability Policy Studies
 Journal of Intellectual & Developmental Disability 
 Journal of Intellectual Disabilities
 Journal of Learning Disabilities 
 Journal of Literary and Cultural Disability Studies
 Learning Disability Practice
 Learning Disability Quarterly
 Review of Disability Studies

Journals
Lists of academic journals
Journals
Disability-related lists